This is a list of seasons completed by the Arizona Rattlers. The Rattlers are a professional arena football franchise of the Indoor Football League, based in Phoenix, Arizona. Since its inception in 1992, the team has played its home games at Footprint Center. From 1993 to 2004 the Rattlers made the playoffs every season, including five division championships from 1996 to 1999, and 2004. The team has made nine ArenaBowl appearances, winning five championships in franchise history, ArenaBowl VIII, ArenaBowl XI, ArenaBowl XXV, ArenaBowl XXVI, and ArenaBowl XXVII. Prior to the 2009 season, the AFL announced that it had suspended operations indefinitely and canceled the 2009 season. In September 2009, it was announced that the Rattlers would return for the 2010 season, as a part of the league's relaunching.

References
General
 

Specific

Arena Football League seasons by team
 
Indoor Football League seasons by team
Arizona sports-related lists